Bermondsey West was a parliamentary constituency centred on the Bermondsey district of South London.  It returned one Member of Parliament (MP)  to the House of Commons of the Parliament of the United Kingdom.

The constituency was created for the 1918 general election and abolished for the 1950 general election.

Boundaries 

The constituency, when it was created in 1918, comprised the wards numbered One, Two, Three and Four of the Metropolitan Borough of Bermondsey, in the County of London. This was the south-western part of the borough, and was similar in extent to the preceding Bermondsey Division of the parliamentary borough of Southwark.

It covered South Bermondsey ward and most of London Bridge & West Bermondsey ward, together with small sections of North Bermondsey, Chaucer and Old Kent Road wards, in the modern day London Borough of Southwark.

Members of Parliament

Election results

Election in the 1910s

*endorsed by Coalition Government

Election in the 1920s

Election in the 1930s

Glanville was a son of the former MP Harold Glanville. Conservative candidate Francis Howard Collier withdrew when Glanville gave an undertaking to support the National Government.

Election in the 1940s

References 

 Boundaries of Parliamentary Constituencies 1885-1972, compiled and edited by F.W.S. Craig (Parliamentary Reference Publications 1972)

Parliamentary constituencies in London (historic)
Constituencies of the Parliament of the United Kingdom established in 1918
Constituencies of the Parliament of the United Kingdom disestablished in 1950
Politics of the London Borough of Southwark